Urajärvi is a medium-sized lake in the Kymijoki main catchment area in Kymenlaakso region, Finland. It is located in the Iitti municipality near to Kausala, the administrative center of Iitti.

See also
List of lakes in Finland

References

Lakes of Iitti